Clyde Elton Love (December 12, 1882 – January 31, 1960) was an American contract bridge author and mathematics professor at the University of Michigan, Ann Arbor.  He was a native of Bancroft, Michigan and graduated from the University of Michigan in 1905.

Love is well known in bridge circles for his 1959 book Bridge Squeezes Complete, one of the earliest efforts to codify then-existing squeeze play. Love established rules for recognizing bridge squeezes, and for executing them when they occurred. His system of classifying squeezes has been used by most bridge writers since.  He was also author of many magazine articles.

He died at his home in Ann Arbor, aged 77. He was survived by his wife and daughter.

Bibliography
 
 
 
 Differential and Integral Calculus, 1916-1970 
 Analytic Geometry, 1923-1955 
 Elements of Analytic Geometry, 1931-1956 
 On the Asymptotic Solutions of Linear Differential Equations, 1913-1914

See also
 Squeeze plays in contract bridge

References

External links

  (including 3 "from old catalog")

1882 births
1960 deaths
20th-century American mathematicians
University of Michigan alumni
University of Michigan faculty
Contract bridge writers
People from Shiawassee County, Michigan